Arturo Costa (born 10 December 1945) is a Cuban former sports shooter. He competed at the 1968 Summer Olympics and the 1972 Summer Olympics.

References

1945 births
Living people
Cuban male sport shooters
Olympic shooters of Cuba
Shooters at the 1968 Summer Olympics
Shooters at the 1972 Summer Olympics
Sportspeople from Havana
Pan American Games medalists in shooting
Pan American Games silver medalists for Cuba
Pan American Games bronze medalists for Cuba
Shooters at the 1967 Pan American Games
20th-century Cuban people